King Edward is an underground station on the Canada Line of Metro Vancouver's SkyTrain rapid transit system. The station is located at the intersection of Cambie Street and King Edward Avenue in Vancouver, British Columbia, Canada, and serves the neighbourhoods of Riley Park–Little Mountain and South Cambie. The station is within walking distance of BC Children's Hospital, Nat Bailey Stadium, and Queen Elizabeth Park.

History
King Edward station was opened in 2009 along with the rest of the Canada Line and was designed by the architecture firm VIA Architecture. The station is named for nearby King Edward Avenue, which in turn is named after King Edward VII.

Structure and design
Like Burrard and Granville stations, King Edward station has a distinctive platform design. The inbound track to Waterfront is stacked above the outbound track to Richmond–Brighouse and YVR–Airport.

Services
The station is served by the #15 bus providing local surface service along Cambie Street, by the #25 bus operating east to Brentwood Town Centre station and west to the University of British Columbia, and by the #33 bus operating east to 29th Avenue station and west to the University of British Columbia.

Station information

Station layout

Entrances
King Edward station is served by a single entrance at the northwest corner of Cambie Street and King Edward Avenue.

Transit connections

The following bus routes can be found in close proximity to King Edward station:

References

Canada Line stations
Railway stations in Canada opened in 2009
Buildings and structures in Vancouver
2009 establishments in British Columbia